Sidney Edward James Russell (4 October 1937 – 18 June 1994) was an English cricketer and footballer.

Sid Russell was born in Feltham, Middlesex and played in 142 first-class cricket matches for Middlesex (1960-1964), Marylebone Cricket Club (MCC) (1961) and Gloucestershire (1965-1968) as a sound right-handed batsman, scoring 5,464 runs (average 23.86), with a highest score of 130. He scored 4 centuries and 21 fifties, as well as taking 41 catches.

He played in 61 matches for Middlesex as an uncapped professional. He scored 2,681 runs from 105 innings at an average score of 27.63, with a top score of 130. He scored 1,119 runs at 31.08 in his debut season, a feat that he later repeated for Gloucestershire. He later played club cricket in the Bristol area of Almondsbury and for the Civil Service.

He also played in 54 Football League matches as a left back for Brentford between 1956 and 1961. He died from a heart attack in Quebec, Canada aged 56.

References

External links
 Cricinfo
 Cricket Archive

1937 births
1994 deaths
Brentford F.C. players
English cricketers
English footballers
Gloucestershire cricketers
Marylebone Cricket Club cricketers
Middlesex cricketers
Footballers from Feltham
English Football League players
Association football fullbacks
Southern Football League players
Bexley United F.C. players